(Since heaven cared for Anhalt's fame and bliss), BWV66.1, BWV66a, is a congratulatory cantata by Johann Sebastian Bach. The work was first performed in Köthen on 10 December 1718.

History 
Bach composed the secular cantata, or serenata, in 1718 in Köthen to celebrate the twenty-fourth birthday of his employer Leopold, Prince of Anhalt-Köthen on 10 December. The cantata text was by Christian Friedrich Hunold, who was based at Halle. Bach and Hunold collaborated on other cantatas, including one for the same birthday, .

Hunold's text was included in a collection,  (Selected and partly never printed poems), which he published the following year, and has thus survived. Bach's music has been lost apart from a fragment, but there is scope for its reconstruction as he recycled some of it in at least one sacred work.

Bach adapted several movements for his 1724 cantata for Easter Monday, . While the structure of the sacred cantata is different (it is closed with a chorale, and it opens with music from the closing movement of the secular cantata), Bach preserved the original dialogue form in which two allegorical figures appear.

John Eliot Gardiner has suggested that instrumental music from the lost cantata survives in another cantata from the composer's Leipzig years.

Structure 
The work has eight movements:
 Recitative: 
 Aria: 
 Duet recitative: 
 Duet aria: 
 Duet recitative: 
 Aria: 
 Duet recitative: 
 Chorus:

Publication 
Der Himmel dacht auf Anhalts Ruhm und Glück was published in the Neue Bach-Ausgabe, edited by Alfred Dürr, with a critical report 1964. The cantata was published in a critical edition of Alexander Grychtolik's reconstruction by Breitkopf & Härtel].

Recordings 
 Mitteldeutsche Hofmusik, Alexander Grychtolik. Ruhm und Glück (Fame and Happiness). Rondeau Production, 2012.

References

External links 
 
 Festkonzert Köthener Bachfesttage 2018

1718 compositions
Secular cantatas by Johann Sebastian Bach
Lost musical works by Johann Sebastian Bach